The Public Services, Tax and Commerce Union (PTC) was a short-lived trade union in the United Kingdom.

The union was formed in January 1996, when the Inland Revenue Staff Federation merged with the National Union of Civil and Public Servants.  The general secretaries of the two former unions, Clive Brooke and John Sheldon respectively, became joint general secretaries of the new union.

The union primarily worked in the Civil Service, but also in other public organisations.  In March 1998, the union joined with the Civil and Public Services Association (CPSA), forming the Public and Commercial Services Union (PCS).

References

Trade unions established in 1996
Trade unions disestablished in 1998
Defunct trade unions of the United Kingdom
Civil service trade unions
1996 establishments in the United Kingdom